The 1923 Vanderbilt Commodores baseball team represented the Vanderbilt Commodores of Vanderbilt University in the 1923 NCAA baseball season,

Schedule/Results

References

1923 Southern Conference baseball season
Vanderbilt Commodores baseball seasons
1923 in sports in Tennessee